Öztoprak is a Turkish surname. Notable people with the surname include:

 Canan Öztoprak (born 1955), Turkish Cypriot politician
 Hüseyin Öztoprak, Turkish Cypriot politician

See also
 Öztoprak, İspir

Turkish-language surnames